was a Japanese author of novels and romantic poetry during the Meiji period, noted as one of the inventors of Japanese naturalism.

Early life and education
Doppo Kunikida was born in Chōshi, Chiba as Tetsuo Kunikida. While some doubt exists as to his biological father, Doppo was raised by his mother and her samurai-class husband. The family moved to Tokyo in 1874, but relocated to Yamaguchi prefecture and Doppo grew up in Iwakuni. The rural area of Chōshū left Doppo with a love of nature and influenced the naturalism which later appeared in his literature. Doppo quit school in order to help support his family in 1888, but left for school in Tokyo in 1889.

He studied at the English department of Tōkyō Senmon Gakkō (now Waseda University). Interested in western democracy, he developed a defiant attitude to the school's administration and was expelled from the school in 1891. When he was 21 years old, he was baptized by Uemura Masahisa and became a Christian. His religion and the poetry of William Wordsworth influenced his later writing style.

Career and personal life 

Kunikida founded a literary magazine Seinen bungaku (青年文學 "Literature for Youth") in 1892 and began his private diary Azamukazaru no ki (欺かざるの記 "An Honest Record", published after his death) in 1893, the same year he began teaching English, mathematics, and history in Saiki, another rural area of Japan.

In 1894, he joined the news staff of the Kokumin Shimbun newspaper as a war correspondent. His reports from the front during the First Sino-Japanese War, which were collected and re-published after his death as Aitei Tsushin, (愛弟通信 "Communiques to a Dear Brother") found high favor among the readers.

The following year, Kunikida settled with his parents in Tokyo, where he edited the magazine Kokumin no Tomo (國民の友 "The Nation's Friend") and met his future wife, Nobuko Sasaki, on whom Takeo Arishima is thought to have based his famous novel A Certain Woman. Against her parents' wishes (Nobuko's mother encouraged her to commit suicide rather than marry Doppo), the couple was married in November 1895. Kunikida's ensuing financial difficulties caused the pregnant Nobuko to divorce him after only five months. The failed marriage had a traumatic effect on Doppo, and his depression and mental anguish over the separation can be seen in Azamukazaru no Ki, published from 1908 to 1909.

Shortly after his divorce, Kunikida turned to the genre of romantic poetry when co-authored an anthology, Jojoshi (抒情詩 "Lyric Poems"), in 1897 with Katai Tayama and Kunio Matsuoka (a.k.a. Kunio Yanagita). Around this time, Kunikida published several poems that would eventually be collected in Doppo gin as well as the short story, Gen Oji (源叔父 "Uncle Gen"). Through his poetic style, Kunikida introduced a fresh current into romantic lyrical literature.

Kunikida remarried in 1898, to Haruko Enomoto, and published his first short-story collection, Musashino (武蔵野 "The Musashi Plain") in 1901, which portrayed people who fall behind the times.

However, Kunikida's style began to change. Although Haru no Tori (春の鳥 "Spring Birds"), written in 1904, reportedly reached the highest level of romanticism in his era, his later works, such as Kyushi (窮死 "A Poor Man's Death") and Take no Kido (竹の木戸 "The Bamboo Gate"), Kunikida indicate that he was turning more towards naturalism over romanticism.

Following the Russo-Japanese War in 1905, Kunikida started a publishing business that went bankrupt two years later. The same year he founded a magazine, Fujin Gahō.

Death
Kunikida contracted tuberculosis in 1907 and moved to a sanatorium in Chigasaki in early 1908. He died from the disease in 1908 at the age of 36. His grave is at Aoyama Cemetery in Tokyo.

Trivia
 Kunikida is a main character in Bungo Stray Dogs, which uses writers, their biographies and their works to create characters. He is friends with the character named after Katai Tayama and the writer's short-lived relationship with Sasaki Nobuko also returns in the series.

See also 
 Japanese literature
 List of Japanese writers

References

 Katō, Shūichi. A History of Japanese Literature. RoutledgeCurzon; 1 edition (1997).

In English
 River Mist & Other Stories. Kodansha America (1983) 
 Selected stories of Doppo Kunikida. Shichosha. ASIN: B00087VZWW

External links 
 National Diet Library
 
 
 e-texts of Doppo's works at Aozora bunko
 Doppo Kunikida's grave
 青空文庫国木田独歩
 アスネタ国木田独歩
 あらら本舗国木田独歩

Waseda University alumni
20th-century Japanese poets
Japanese male short story writers
Japanese diarists
People from Chōshi
People of Meiji-period Japan
20th-century deaths from tuberculosis
1871 births
1908 deaths
Tuberculosis deaths in Japan
19th-century Japanese poets
19th-century Japanese novelists
20th-century Japanese novelists
19th-century Japanese short story writers
20th-century Japanese short story writers
Japanese male poets
20th-century Japanese male writers
19th-century diarists
Japanese magazine founders